Cirrhilabrus katoi is a species of wrasse native to Japan.

Etymology
The specific name honours Shoichi Kato, who collected the type specimen.

Description 
It has been described as having 11 total dorsal spines and 25 vertebrae.

References

katoi
Taxa named by Hiroshi Senou
Taxa named by Tomonori Hirata
Fish described in 2000